The North Dakota College Athletic Conference (NDCAC) was a collegiate athletic conference that ceased operations following the 1999–00 academic school year when it merged with the South Dakota Intercollegiate Conference to form the Dakota Athletic Conference. The conference originally started as the Interstate Athletic Conference in 1922, with five North Dakota schools and Moorhead State Teachers College from Minnesota. Moorhead State left in 1931 to help found the Northern State Teachers Conference in 1931, and the remaining members brought in more schools to regroup as the NDCAC.

Members
The following is a list of historic members:

Membership timeline

Football champions

1931 – Minot State and North Dakota–Ellendale
1932 – Minot State and North Dakota–Ellendale
1933 – Jamestown
1934 – Jamestown
1935 – Jamestown
1936 – North Dakota Science
1937 – North Dakota Science
1938 – North Dakota Science
1939 – North Dakota Science
1940 – Mayville State
1941 – Jamestown
1942 – North Dakota Science
1943 – No champion
1944 – No champion
1945 – No champion
1946 – Minot State
1947 – Valley City State
1948 – Minot State and North Dakota Science
1949 – Valley City State
1950 – Valley City State
1951 – Dickinson State and Valley City State
1953 – Valley City State
1954 – Minot State and Valley City State
1955 – Dickinson State and Jamestown
1956 – Jamestown
1957 – Jamestown
1958 – Dickinson State and Valley City State
1959 – Mayville State
1960 – Dickinson State and Mayville State
1961 – Mayville State
1962 – Minot State and North Dakota Science
1963 – Valley City State
1964 –  and 
1965 – 

1966 –  and 
1967 – Jamestown
1968 – Jamestown
1969 – Jamestown
1970 – Minot State
1971 – Jamestown and Minot State
1972 – Minot State and Valley City State
1973 – Minot State
1974 – Minot State
1975 – Dickinson State and Jamestown
1976 – Valley City State
1977 – Valley City State
1978 – Valley City State
1979 – Jamestown
1980 – Valley City State
1981 – Dickinson State
1982 – Dickinson State and Valley City State
1983 – Minot State and Valley City State
1984 – Jamestown and Valley City State
1985 – Minot State
1986 – Dickinson State
1987 – Dickinson State
1988 – Valley City State
1989 – Dickinson State
1990 – Dickinson State and Mayville State
1991 – Dickinson State and Minot State
1992 – Dickinson State, Mary, and Minot State
1993 – Minot State
1994 – Dickinson State and Minot State
1995 – Dickinson State
1996 – Mary and Valley City State
1997 – Jamestown
1998 – Minot State
1999 – Mary

See also
List of defunct college football conferences
Dakota Athletic Conference
Mon-Dak Conference

References

 
College sports in North Dakota